Wodnika is an extinct genus of shark which lived in the Late Permian period in the present area of Germany and Russia. It measured about 1 m (3.2 ft) in length and its tail shape indicates it was probably a good swimmer. Internally, the cartilage skeleton is preserved on the fossil, which is fairly rare for fossilized sharks.

References

Permian sharks
Permian fish of Europe
Fossils of Germany
Kupferschiefer